This is a detailed list of releases by the European band The Legendary Pink Dots. , they have released 32 studio albums, 52 live albums and compilations, and 14 singles. Their first release was the cassette Only Dreaming in 1981, initially limited to 10 copies only, each with their own, handmade cover. After a few more cassette-only releases, Brighter Now saw the light of day in the following year, as their first 'proper' album.

From the start, their output has been quite prolific, with no less than four tapes released in the first year of their existence alone. This would not change until the late nineties, with a new album with original material every 1–2 years only, but accompanied by re-releases of early, hard-to-find material, and live albums.

In addition, singer Edward Ka-Spel has released more than 60 solo albums to date, and he and other members of the band have collaborated in various other projects, most notably in The Tear Garden, which originally consisted of Ka-Spel and cEvin Key of Skinny Puppy, but later expanded to involve all current Pink Dots members as well as several friends of both the Pink Dots and Key.

Another notable peculiarity in the Pink Dots' discography is their affection for vinyl. With only a few exceptions, all of their albums have seen vinyl editions in addition to the standard CD release, many of them (like their 2010 studio album, Seconds Late For The Brighton Line) featuring exclusive tracks not found on the CD, although some may later appear on the digital release.

In their history, The Legendary Pink Dots have released—and re-released—their records on a large number of labels, as well as having their own label, The Terminal Kaleidoscope, and a bandcamp.com page for digital self-distribution.

Studio releases

Compilations

Live albums

Singles and EPs

Videos

References

Legendary Pink Dots, The
Discographies of British artists
Pop music group discographies
Rock music group discographies